, born , was the founder and leader of the Japanese doomsday cult known as Aum Shinrikyo. He was convicted of masterminding the deadly 1995 sarin gas attack on the Tokyo subway, and was also involved in several other crimes. Asahara was sentenced to death in 2004, and his final appeal failed in 2011. In June 2012, his execution was postponed due to further arrests of Aum members. He was ultimately executed on July 6, 2018.

Early life 
Shoko Asahara was born as Chizuo Matsumoto on March 2, 1955, into a large, poor family of tatami-mat-makers in Kumamoto Prefecture. He had infantile glaucoma from birth, which made him lose all sight in his left eye and go partially blind in his right eye at a young age, and was thus enrolled in a school for the blind. Asahara was known to be a bully at the school, taking advantage of the other students by beating them and extorting money from them. He graduated in 1977 and turned to the study of acupuncture and traditional Chinese medicine, which were common careers for the blind in Japan. He married the following year and eventually fathered 6 children, the eldest of whom was born in 1978.

In 1981, Asahara was convicted of practicing pharmacy without a license and selling unregulated drugs, for which he was fined .

Asahara's interest in religion reportedly started at this time. Having been recently married, he worked to support his large and growing family. He dedicated his free time to the study of various religious concepts, starting with Chinese astrology and Taoism.

Later, Asahara practiced Western esotericism, yoga, meditation, esoteric Buddhism, and esoteric Christianity.

Aum Shinrikyo
In 1984, Asahara formed Aum Shinsen no Kai (オウム神仙の会). He changed his name from Chizuo Matsumoto to Shoko Asahara and renamed his group Aum Shinrikyo in 1987. Asahara applied for government registration and, against the advice of cult experts and government officials, the Tokyo Metropolitan Government granted it legal recognition as a religious corporation in 1989.

After this, a monastic order was established, and many lay followers joined. Asahara gained credibility by appearing on TV and on magazine covers. He gradually attained a following of believers and began being invited to lecture-meeting at universities. Asahara also wrote several religious books, including Beyond Life and Death and Supreme Initiation.

The doctrine of Aum Shinrikyo is based on the Vajrayana scriptures, the Bible, and other texts. In 1992 Asahara declared himself Christ, Japan's only fully enlightened master, and identified with the Lamb of God.

His purported mission was to take others' sins upon himself, and he claimed he could transfer spiritual power to his followers. He saw dark conspiracies everywhere, promulgated by the Jews, the Freemasons, the Dutch, the British Royal Family, and rival Japanese religions.

He outlined a doomsday prophecy, which included a third World War, and described a final conflict culminating in a nuclear "Armageddon", borrowing the term from the Book of Revelation .

Asahara often preached the necessity of Armageddon for "human relief." He eventually declared, "Put tantra Vajrayana into practice in accordance with the doctrines of Mahamudra," and he led a series of terrorist attacks using a secret organization hidden from ordinary believers.

Tokyo subway gas attack and arrest

On March 20, 1995, members of Aum Shinrikyo attacked the Tokyo subway with the nerve agent sarin. Thirteen people died and thousands more suffered ill effects. After finding sufficient evidence, authorities accused Aum Shinrikyo of complicity in the attack, as well as in a number of smaller-scale incidents. Dozens of disciples were arrested, Aum's facilities were raided, and the court issued an order for Asahara's arrest. In the following months, a general attitude to perceive new religions and cults as a potential danger for the whole society spread among the Japanese people.

On May 16, 1995, the police investigated the headquarters of Aum Shinrikyo. Asahara was discovered in a very small, isolated room in one of the facilities.

Wary of possible Aum military power, the First Airborne Brigade of the Japan Ground Self-Defense Force was stationed nearby to support the police if needed.

Trial and execution

Asahara faced 27 counts of murder in 13 separate indictments. The prosecution argued that Asahara gave orders to attack the Tokyo Subway to "overthrow the government and install himself in the position of Emperor of Japan".

Later, during the trial which took more than seven years to conclude, the prosecution forwarded an additional theory that the attacks were ordered to divert police attention away from Aum. The prosecution also accused Asahara of masterminding the Matsumoto incident (another sarin attack nine months earlier that killed eight people) and the Sakamoto family murder. According to Asahara's defense team, a group of senior followers initiated the atrocities and kept them a secret from Asahara.

During the trials, some of the disciples testified against Asahara, and he was found guilty on 13 of 17 charges, including the Sakamoto family murder; four charges were dropped. On February 27, 2004, he was sentenced to death. The trial was called the "trial of the century" by the Japanese media.

The defence appealed Asahara's sentencing on the grounds that he was mentally unfit and psychiatric examinations were undertaken. During much of the trials, Asahara remained silent or only muttered to himself. However, he communicated with the staff at his detention facility, which convinced the examiner that Asahara was maintaining his silence out of free will. Owing to his lawyers' failure to submit the statement of reason for appeal, the Tokyo High Court decided on March 27, 2006, not to grant them leave to appeal. This decision was upheld by the Supreme Court of Japan on September 15, 2006.

Two re-trial appeals were declined by the appellate court. In June 2012, Asahara's execution was postponed due to arrests of several fugitive Aum Shinrikyo members.

Asahara was executed by hanging at the Tokyo Detention House on July 6, 2018, 23 years after the sarin gas attack, along with six other cult members. Relatives of victims said they approved the execution. Asahara's final words, as reported by officials, assigned his remains to his fourth daughter, who was unsympathetic to the cult and stated she planned to dispose of the ashes at sea; this was contested by Asahara's wife, third daughter, and other family members, who were suspected of wanting to enshrine the ashes where believers can honor them. As of March 2020, the ashes were still at the Tokyo Detention House.

See also

 Capital punishment in Japan
 Doomsday cult
 List of executions in Japan
 List of people claimed to be Jesus
 Messiah complex
 Hong Xiuquan

References

Further reading
 —highlights the main stages of Yogic and Buddhist practice, comparing Yoga-sutra system by Patanjali and the Eightfold Noble Path from Buddhist tradition.
 —focuses on the process of Kundalini-Yoga, one of the stages in Aum's practice.

External links

A Japan Times article  about two documentary films on Aleph

BBC profile of Asahara

1955 births
2018 deaths
20th-century Japanese criminals
Aum Shinrikyo
Japanese mass murderers
Japanese religious leaders
Religious leaders convicted of crimes
Executed Japanese people
Self-declared messiahs
People from Yatsushiro, Kumamoto
People executed by Japan by hanging
Blind clergy
Japanese blind people
Members of the clergy convicted of murder
Japanese people convicted of murder
Executed mass murderers
Japanese conspiracy theorists
Anti-Masonry
Antisemitism in Japan
Founders of new religious movements
Cult leaders
20th-century apocalypticists
21st-century apocalypticists
21st-century executions by Japan